Henry Bascom Steagall (May 19, 1873 – November 22, 1943) was a United States representative from Alabama. He was chairman of the Committee on Banking and Currency and in 1933, he co-sponsored the Glass–Steagall Act with Carter Glass, an act that introduced banking reforms and established the Federal Deposit Insurance Corporation (FDIC). With Senator Robert F. Wagner, he co-sponsored the Wagner-Steagall National Housing Act of September 1937 which created the United States Housing Authority.

Life

Steagall was born in Clopton, Alabama, on May 19, 1873. His paternal grandfather came to America from England. Steagall attended the Southeast Alabama Agricultural School at Abbeville and graduated from the law department of the University of Alabama at Tuscaloosa in 1893. He served as the county solicitor of Dale County from 1902 to 1908 and was a Democratic member of the Alabama House of Representatives from 1906 to 1907. Steagall was elected to the U.S. House of Representatives for Alabama's 3rd District in 1915 and served until 1943. He voted in favor of the 1941 Lend Lease act to provide military aid to the United Kingdom in World War II. He died while in office on November 22, 1943, in Washington, D.C. He was inducted into the Alabama Lawyers' Hall of Fame in 2002.

Pronunciation
Asked how to say his name, he told The Literary Digest that it was stee-gall (like the words tea and gall), with equal stress on each syllable. He added, "This pronunciation is generally used throughout the South, and rarely used in the North. American northerners persist in stressing the first syllable and rhyming the name with 'eagle'." He was known by African-Americans in Alabama as "Marse Henry."

See also
 List of United States Congress members who died in office (1900–49)

References

Further reading

.

1873 births
1943 deaths
People from Dale County, Alabama
Democratic Party members of the Alabama House of Representatives
University of Alabama School of Law alumni
Democratic Party members of the United States House of Representatives from Alabama